Rudbar (also Romanized as Rūdbār; also known as Ravīdar-e Soflá, Rūdar-e Bālā, and Rūdār-i-Bāla) is a village in Rudbar Rural District, Ruydar District, Khamir County, Hormozgan Province, Iran. At the 2006 census, its population was 1,259, in 258 families.

References 

Populated places in Khamir County